Minisauripus is an ichnogenus of dinosaur footprint. Minisauripus is regarded as the smallest pre KT-extinction dinosaur ever discovered. It was less than 20 cm (7.8 inches) long. Its footprints have been found in the Jinju Formation and the Feitianshan Formation, a low-energy lake formation. Its footprints were found within the vicinity of those of the larger Jialingpus.

Identification
Based on the trackways, Minisauripus was possibly a hatchling theropod. However, ichnopalaeontologists aren't sure if it belonged to an actual juvenile dinosaur. The Minisauripus tracks show three distinct toes, unlike the tracks of similar-sized small dromaeosaurids such as Dromaeosauripus rarus, which are didactyl, with the "killer claw" on the inner toe being held off the ground and thus not preserved in the trackway.

See also

 List of dinosaur ichnogenera

References

Dinosaur trace fossils
Theropods